ICF International, Inc. is a Reston, Virginia-based global consulting and technology services company, which provides a range of services for governments and businesses, including strategic planning, management, marketing and analytics.

The company was founded in 1969, and as of 2019, had US $1.48 billion in revenue, with approximately 7,000 full and part time employees in more than 90 offices.

History

1969–2006: Early history
ICF was founded in 1969 as the Inner City Fund. Its first president was Clarence D. Lester, a Tuskegee Airman, who was joined by three U.S. Department of Defense analysts. As a venture capital firm, Inner City Fund sought to finance and help minority-owned businesses win government contracts.

The company reorganized as a consulting firm and renamed itself ICF Incorporated. The firm transitioned from venture capital to consulting on energy issues for U.S. federal agencies, which was the company's main focus throughout the 1970s and into the 1980s.

ICF acquired Kaiser Engineering in 1988 and went public in 1989. The combined company became known as ICF Kaiser. Under this banner, the company worked in consulting, engineering and construction services. ICF and Kaiser split in 1999 when an investment group bought the consulting business for about $70 million.

In 2006, the consultancy was renamed ICF International and in September that year, the company went public, trading on the NASDAQ as ICFI. The company received criticism of its management of the Road Home program in the aftermath of Hurricane Katrina. In an article in The Washington Post, the company said it had addressed problems raised in those criticisms, and that state and federal fraud-prevention rules were in flux and made the grants administration process more time-consuming. The company later supported the Hurricane Sandy relief efforts for the State of New Jersey.

2007–present: Expansion of commercial work
Beginning in the 2000s, ICF grew in size and scope through a series of acquisitions. These acquisitions expanded the services offered by ICF and moved the company more into the commercial space. In 2007, federal, state and local government contracts generated 92 percent of company revenues. Commercial work, which accounted for 6 percent of revenues in 2007, grew to 20 percent of revenues by 2011. By the end of 2016, commercial work accounted for 35 percent of revenues.

In 2012, the company expanded its international business by acquiring London-based GHK Holding Limited, a consulting agency working with government and commercial clients.  In 2014, it expanded its European presence with the acquisition of Belgian communications firm Mostra S.A. Through GHK and ICF Mostra, the company has worked with the European Commission.

In 2014, ICF acquired advertising agency Olson for $295 million. The company's work includes campaigns for Belize; Skittles, whose "Marshawn Lynch’s Skittles Press Conference" was named PRWeek'''s Product Brand Development Campaign of the Year in 2016; and Puppy Bowl sponsor Bissell. In 2016, ICF created ICF Olson, a public relations and marketing division. In addition to Olson, the new division absorbed other ICF acquisitions, including digital service firm Ironworks and engagement house CityTech.

ICF International rebranded as ICF in 2016.

In 2017, PRWeek reported that ICF/ICF Olson had experienced high growth in its public relations and digital business.

 2019 - ICF NEXT 
In 2019, ICF launched subsidiary ICF NEXT, led by John Armstrong, who had previously co-founded IBM's Interactive Experience (iX) internal agency.

Operations and services
ICF is publicly traded on the NASDAQ as ICFI, and is headquartered in Reston, Virginia. As of year-end 2019, ICF employed around 8,000 workers in 75 regional offices throughout the U.S. and 15 offices in other countries.Form 10-K, p. 54 John Wasson is chair and chief executive officer. Barry Broadus is CFO.

The company provides management, technology and policy consulting, cybersecurity and implementation services in the following markets: government, energy, environment, infrastructure, transportation, health, education, social programs, public safety and security, consumer and financial.Form 10-K, p. 9 ICF initially focused on federal government consulting contracts in energy and the environment and expanded its commercial work in subsequent years.

Notable work
ICF's Integrated Planning Model (IPM) has been used by the U.S. Environmental Protection Agency (EPA) to project the impact of electric power business sector policies on the environment and to analyze the Clean Power Plan, Carbon Standards for New Power Plants, Mercury and Air Toxics Standards and the Cross-State Air Pollution Rule.

Other agencies, including the U.S. Forest Service of the U.S. Department of Agriculture, the Surface Transportation Board and the Federal Energy Regulatory Commission, have used IPM.

The EPA has awarded contracts to ICF to assist with the agency's Energy Star program, including technical and analytical support. The company also conducts the Demographic and Health Survey funded by the United States Agency for International Development.

Major acquisitions
Below is a table of ICF's major acquisitions: 

Rankings and recognition
RankingsForbes ranked ICF No. 186 on its list of America's best midsize companies in 2017PRWeek ranked ICF No. 15 on its Agency Business report in 2017Advertising Age'' listed ICF Olson among its list of the 50 largest agencies in the world in 2016

Recognition
Women in Technology’s The Leadership Foundry presented its 2016 Corporate Leadership Award to ICF, whose eight-member board of directors includes three women
ICF's Olson Engage won Best in Show at the In2 SABRE Awards in 2016 for its Skittles Super Bowl campaign
ICF was named a “Fast Moving” brand by GBC, the research wing of the Government Executive Media Group, in its 2017 Leading Brands in Government study

References

External links
 Official website

1969 establishments in Virginia
Companies based in Fairfax, Virginia
Companies listed on the Nasdaq
American companies established in 1969
Consulting firms established in 1969
Consulting firms of the United States